Chicago Hope is an American medical drama television series created by David E. Kelley. It premiered on CBS on September 18, 1994, and ended on May 4, 2000, with a total of 141 episodes over the course of 6 seasons. The series is set in a fictional private charitable hospital in Chicago.

Series overview

Episodes

Season 1 (1994–1995)

Season 2 (1995–1996)

Season 3 (1996–1997)

Season 4 (1997–1998)

Season 5 (1998–1999)

Season 6 (1999–2000)

References

External links
 

Lists of American drama television series episodes